Chryseobacterium hominis  is a Gram-negative bacteria from the genus of Chryseobacterium which has been isolated from blood from a patient in Belgium and from the fish Arothron hispidus.

References

Further reading

External links
Type strain of Chryseobacterium hominis at BacDive -  the Bacterial Diversity Metadatabase

hominis
Bacteria described in 2007